Reading Hospital is a 738-bed non-profit teaching hospital located in West Reading, Pennsylvania. The hospital was established in 1867 and is a part of Tower Health System. 

Reading Hospital is a certified stroke center, and the emergency department includes a level I trauma center. The hospital operates several residency training programs for newly graduated physicians such as internal medicine, internal medicine osteopathic, transitional year, family medicine, OB/GYN, emergency medicine, anesthesiology, general surgery, neurology, podiatric surgery & psychiatry. One year pharmacy residency is also offered. The residency programs are accredited by the Accreditation Council for Graduate Medical Education.  The internal medicine residency is also accredited by the American Osteopathic Association.

History
In November 1867, physicians with the Reading Medical Association and 16 local business leaders developed plans for the area's first hospital. The Reading Dispensary opened in downtown Reading on Jan. 27, 1868, and moved to northwest Reading in 1886 under its new name, The Reading Hospital. Public demand for hospital care led to constant expansion, resulting in the 1926 relocation to the present  site in West Reading. In 2017 the Reading hospital introduced Tower Health. This included a purchase of  Brandywine Hospital in Coatesville; Chestnut Hill Hospital, a teaching hospital in Philadelphia; Jennersville Hospital in West Grove; Phoenixville Hospital in Phoenixville; and Pottstown Hospital in Pottstown; St. Christopher's Hospital for Children in Philadelphia; and 20 urgent care locations across the service area. In 2019, a 16-bed pediatric emergency department was added.

In 2017, Reading Hospital treated more than 133,000 people in its emergency room, delivered 3,500 babies, provided more than 750,000 outpatient services and 33,000 inpatient admissions. Reading Hospital operates a level I trauma center. The hospital is certified as an advanced primary stroke center.

Graduate medical education
Reading Hospital operates a number of residency training programs for newly graduated physicians. Programs include Emergency Medicine, Family Medicine, Internal Medicine, OB/GYN, Podiatric Medicine and Surgery, and a Transitional Year. All programs are accredited by the Accreditation Council for Graduate Medical Education (ACGME).  The internal medicine program is also dually accredited by the American Osteopathic Association.  There is also a residency programs for pharmacists.
In January 2021, Tower Health announced additional residency programs in neurology and physical medicine and rehabilitation, as well as fellowship programs in nephrology, plastic surgery, sleep medicine, and pulmonary disease and critical care medicine.

Accreditation
 Magnet Recognition
 Commission on Accreditation of Rehabilitation Facilities Accreditation
 Commission on Cancer Accreditation and Gold Rating
 Joint Commission's Gold Seal of Approval
 Joint Commission Disease-Specific Certification
 Quality Oncology Practice Initiative Certification
 Certified Urgent Care Center Category 1 Designation by the Urgent Care Association of America
 The Society of Cardiovascular Patient Care Chest Pain Center
 Undersea and Hyperbaric Medicine Society Full Accreditation
 Commission on Cancer of the American College of Surgeons Approval with Commendation
 American Association of Blood Banks Accreditation

Affiliations 
 Academic Centers
 Alvernia University
Drexel University College of Medicine
 Duke University
 Jefferson Medical College of Thomas Jefferson University
 The Johns Hopkins Clinical Research Network
 McMasters University
 Penn State Hershey College of Medicine
 Philadelphia College of Osteopathic Medicine
 Temple University School of Medicine
University of Michigan
 University of Pennsylvania Health System
 Washington University Medical Center
 Medical Research Institutes
 National Heart, Lung and Blood Institute
 National Institute of Allergy and Infectious Disease
 National Neurological Disorders and Stroke
 Saint Jude Medical

Notable people
 Edward Goljan, MD – a physician and professor of medicine at Oklahoma State University, completed his internship and residency in pathology at Reading Hospital.
 Taylor Swift, international pop superstar was born here in 1989.
 Austin Kingsley Swift, actor was born here in 1992.
John Fetterman, politician was born here in 1969

References

Further reading

External links
 Reading Hospital - Tower Health Website
 St. Christopher's Hospital for Children Specialty Pediatrics

1867 establishments in Pennsylvania
Hospitals established in 1867
Teaching hospitals in Pennsylvania
Trauma centers